Girugamesh is the self-titled second album from the band Girugamesh, released on December 26, 2007. A limited and a regular edition were released, with different contents, as well as a European release featuring three extra tracks from the band's previous EP, Reason of Crying. The regular edition, including thirteen tracks, was released on iTunes simultaneously with the Japanese release. The limited edition included only ten songs on the feature disc, but was supplemented with a DVD with two music videos for "Vermillion" and "Kowareteiku Sekai", and backstage footage.

Music 
The album features a notably heavier sound than their previous album, with a more "aggressive, destructive, and power" sound. Drummer Ryo comments that during touring, the band felt as if "there was something missing in our [Girugamesh's] songs", and the band "wanted to make our songs a little bit harder with an "edge." The band collaborated on "Patchwork", "Stupid" and "Crazy-Flag" with label-mates Tatsurou and Miya of Mucc, and with Miya as the co-producer for the album.

Composition on Girugamesh is fairly consistent with other albums, with the lyrics being written by vocalist Satoshi, and most of the music being written by drummer Ryo, with minimal music composed by Nii and Shuu. The lyrics in the album are often about controversial subjects such as war and hatred. The lyricist, Satoshi, has stated that his lyrics were often written on tour and the "main inspirations are from situations and human relationships me". The music, being mainly composed by Ryo, was often produced when "sit[ting] around at home playing piano, guitar or programming some drum sequences," and the intention was to "make the songs shorter and more efficient" with the heavy sound.

Touring 

In support of Girugamesh, the band toured in both Japan and Europe, under the tour title "Stupid Tour '08"; the tour is named after the "stupid" amount of tour dates, surpassing forty, rather than the song from the album. The Japanese leg had Girugamesh performing a series of one-man lives (i.e. only Girugamesh performing) throughout Japan. Later in January, Girugamesh toured Europe for the first time, visiting Germany, France, the United Kingdom, Sweden and Finland. Following their European tour, Girugamesh continued the "Stupid Tour '08 in Japan", followed by a short pause. In March, Girugamesh returned with a two-man tour with fellow Japanese band Roach, visiting venues all over Japan including Okinawa.

Following a performance at Wacken Open Air, the second support tour will occur, entitled "Shining Tour '08". The first performances begin in July, under the name "Shining Tour '08 [Shooting Summer]". The Japanese tour will endure through July, visiting Osaka and Nagoya, with one finale performance in August at the Liquidroom in Tokyo. Concerts in July will feature second acts, including Gelugugu, Tr. Dan, Sel'm, Dogma, and Deathgaze, while the tour finale show will be a one-man performance, with only Girugamesh.

Track listing

Regular edition

Limited edition

Personnel 
The following are all credited individuals cooperating in this album's creation.

Satoshi Nakamoto – vocals, lyricist
Nii – guitar, composer
ShuU – bass guitar, composer
Яyo – drums, composer
Tatsurou (Mucc) – chorus vocals ("Patchwork")
Miya (Mucc) – chorus vocals ("Stupid", "Crazy-Flag"), co-producer

Masahiro Oishi – executive producer
Tetsuya Tochigi – recording, mixing
Makoto Toonosu – mastering
Tomoya Sakurai – art director
Severin Schweiger – photographer
Taro Otani – "soul advisor"

References

External links 
Bazooka Studio Official Website

Girugamesh albums
2007 albums